The Siege of Jijel was a joint operation by the Barbarossa brothers and Ahmad al-Kadi against a Genoese garrison in the city of Jijel.

The Barbarossa brothers had previously attempted to liberate Bougie from its Spanish yoke, however failed on both occasions. On the second occasion Arudj Reis and his ally Ahmad al-Kadi were initially successful, managing to capture the outer castle, however due to the unanswered request for gunpowder from the Hafsid sultan by Arudj Reis, the pair were forced to abandon the operation. Following this event, the inhabitants of Jijel, a city recently captured and garrisoned by the Genoese, requested help from Arudj Reis.

In 1514 Arudj Reis settled in Jijel, he gathered a force of 2,000 Kabyles and with his ally Ahmad al-Kadi, the King of Kuku, he set himself to free Jijel from Genoese occupation. Arudj Reis and Ahmad al-Kadi annihilated the Genoese garrison freeing the city from Genoese occupation and proceeded to fortify it for their benefit. Arudj Reis was thanked by the inhabitants of Jijel and received the title “Sultan of Jijel”.

References

Battles involving the Kingdom of Kuku
Jijel Province
1514 in the Ottoman Empire